"Dreamin' Away" is the debut single by melody. under the Toy's Factory label released February 19, 2003. The single stayed on the Oricon charts for 8 weeks and peaked at number 33. To date, the single has sold 20,054 copies.

Track listing
 Dreamin' Away (3:18)
 Now (3:33)
 24: Seven (3:30)
 Dreamin' Away: Remix (4:59)

Melody (Japanese singer) songs
2003 debut singles
2003 songs
Toy's Factory singles
Songs written by Fergie (singer)
Songs written by Stefanie Ridel